The 2001 Idea Prokom Open was a combined men's and women's tennis tournament played on outdoor clay courts in Sopot in Poland that was part of the International Series of the 2001 ATP Tour and of Tier III of the 2001 WTA Tour. The tournament ran from 23 July through 29 July 2001.

Finals

Men's singles

 Tommy Robredo defeated  Albert Portas 1–6, 7–5, 7–6 (7–2)
 It was Robredo's only title of the year and the 1st of his career.

Women's singles

 Cristina Torrens Valero defeated  Gala León García 6–2, 6–2
 It was Torrens Valero's only title of the year and the 4th of her career.

Men's doubles

 Paul Hanley /  Nathan Healey defeated  Irakli Labadze /  Attila Sávolt 7–6 (12–10), 6–2
 It was Hanley's only title of the year and the 1st of his career. It was Healey's only title of the year and the 1st of his career.

Women's doubles

 Joannette Kruger /  Francesca Schiavone defeated  Yulia Beygelzimer /  Anastasia Rodionova 6–4, 6–0
 It was Kruger's only title of the year and the 3rd of her career. It was Schiavone's only title of the year and the 1st of her career.

Idea Prokom Open
Idea Prokom Open
Orange Warsaw Open
Orange